The 1940 United States presidential election in Idaho took place on November 5, 1940, as part of the 1940 United States presidential election. State voters chose four representatives, or electors, to the Electoral College, who voted for president and vice president.

Idaho was won by incumbent President Franklin D. Roosevelt (D–New York), running with Secretary of Agriculture Henry A. Wallace, with 54.36% of the popular vote, against Wendell Willkie (R–New York), running with Minority Leader Charles L. McNary, with 45.31% of the popular vote.

, this is the last occasion when Cassia County, Lemhi County and Owyhee County have voted for a Democratic Presidential candidate.

Results

Results by county

See also
 United States presidential elections in Idaho

References

Idaho
1940
1940 Idaho elections